Astroblepus micrescens is a species of catfish of the family Astroblepidae. It can be found on the Orinoco River in Venezuela.

References

Bibliography
Eschmeyer, William N., ed. 1998. Catalog of Fishes. Special Publication of the Center for Biodiversity Research and Information, num. 1, vol. 1–3. California Academy of Sciences. San Francisco, California, United States. 2905. .

Astroblepus
Fish described in 1918
Fish of Venezuela